Reibel Guido (born 7 December 1968) is a German former water polo player. He competed in the men's tournament at the 1992 Summer Olympics.

References

External links
 

1968 births
Living people
German male water polo players
Olympic water polo players of Germany
Water polo players at the 1992 Summer Olympics
Sportspeople from Krefeld